Sir Frank Keith Officer,  (2 October 1889 – 21 June 1969) was an Australian public servant and diplomat, best known for his postings in ambassadorial positions around the world.

Life and career
Keith Officer was born  on 2 October 1889 in Toorak, Melbourne. He was educated at Melbourne Grammar School and Melbourne University.

Between 1914 and 1918, Officer served with the First Australian Imperial Force in Egypt, Gallipoli, France and Belgium.

From 1919 to 1923, Officer was a political officer of the British Colonial Service in Nigeria.

He joined the Australian Department of External Affairs in 1927.

In 1940, Officer was appointed counsellor to the Australian legation in Japan, second in command to Sir John Latham. He was Charge d'Affaires in Tokyo when the Pacific War broke out.

Between 1946 and 1948, Officer was Australian Minister to the Netherlands. Officer was offered the post of Australian Minister to Moscow in 1947.

In 1948, Officer was appointed Australian Ambassador to the Republic of China. He was recalled from Nanking in November 1949 to consult with the Department of External Affairs on the recognition by the United Kingdom of the Communist Government in China.

Between 1950 and 1955 Officer was Australian Ambassador to France. He retired from the Commonwealth Public Service at the end of March 1950. His retirement prompted External Affairs Minister Richard Casey to write a letter touching on Officer's work, in which he said: "you can properly regard yourself not only as one of the founders of the Australian Foreign Service but as a model which men of succeeding generations can seek to emulate."

Awards
In 1917, Officer was awarded the Military Cross. He was appointed an Officer of the Order of the British Empire in 1919. In the 1950 Birthday Honours he was made a Knight Bachelor, for services as ambassador in Paris.

References

Further reading
 

1889 births
1969 deaths
Australian Army officers
Australian Knights Bachelor
Australian military personnel of World War I
Australian Officers of the Order of the British Empire
Australian recipients of the Military Cross
Ambassadors of Australia to China
Ambassadors of Australia to France
Ambassadors of Australia to the Netherlands
Military personnel from Melbourne
Public servants from Melbourne
20th-century Australian public servants
People from Toorak, Victoria